The 2014–15 Texas–Pan American Broncs men's basketball team represented the University of Texas–Pan American during the 2014–15 NCAA Division I men's basketball season. This were head coach Dan Hipsher's second season at UTPA. The Broncs played their home games at the UTPA Fieldhouse and were members of the Western Athletic Conference. They finished the season 10–21, 4–10 in WAC play to finish in a tie for seventh place. They lost in the quarterfinals of the WAC tournament to UMKC.

This was the final season for UTPA as an institution. In 2013, the University of Texas System (UT System) announced that UTPA would merge with the University of Texas at Brownsville to create the new University of Texas Rio Grande Valley (UTRGV), with the new university entering full operation in the 2015–16 school year. The UT System announced in July 2014 that UTRGV would inherit the UTPA athletic program, and in November 2014 UTRGV's new nickname of Vaqueros was announced.

Roster

Schedule and results

|-
! colspan="9" style="background:#f60; color:#060;"| Exhibition

|-
! colspan="9" style="background:#f60; color:#060;"| Regular season

|-
! colspan="9" style="background:#f60; color:#060;"| WAC tournament

References

UT Rio Grande Valley Vaqueros men's basketball seasons
Texas-Pan American